Caleb Rowden is an American politician. He is a member of the Missouri State Senate, having served since 2017. A member of the Republican Party, Rowden previously served in the Missouri House of Representatives from 2013 to 2017. In November 2018, Rowden was elected by his Republican colleagues to be the majority leader in the Missouri Senate's 2019 session.

Missouri Senate 
Rowden was first elected in 2017, and he was chosen to be the majority leader for the 2019 session.

Committee assignments 

 Administration (Vice-Chairman)
 Gubernatorial Appointments (Vice-Chairman)
 Rules, Joint Rules, Resolutions and Ethics (Chairman)
 Select Committee on Redistricting
 Missouri Arts Council Trust Fund Board of Trustees
 Missouri Justice Reinvestment Task Force
 Missouri State Capitol Commission

Personal life
Rowden is married to Aubrey Rowden, the co-owner of Love Tree Studios, a wedding photography company. They have two children. Rowden himself owns Clarius Interactive, a media and marketing company. He attended the University of Missouri, Columbia.

Electoral history

State Representative

State Senate

References

External links

|-

|-

|-

1982 births
21st-century American politicians
Living people
Republican Party members of the Missouri House of Representatives
Republican Party Missouri state senators